

Countess of Alençon

House of Bellême, ?–?

House of Capet, 1269–1284

House of Valois, 1291–1414/5

Duchess of Alençon

First Creation

Second Creation 
None

Third Creation

Fourth Creation

Fifth Creation

See also
List of consorts of Orléans

Sources
CAPET

 
Alencon
Alencon